SMS G8 was a V1-class large torpedo boat of the Imperial German Navy. She was built by the Germaniawerft shipyard at Kiel between 1911 and 1912, completing on 6 August 1912.

She served throughout the First World War, taking part in the Battle of Heligoland Bight on 28 August 1914, the Battle of Dogger Bank in 1915 and the Battle of Jutland in 1916. Post war, G8 served in the Weimar Republic's Reichsmarine, and was modernised in 1928, when she was lengthened and re-armed. She continued to serve with Nazi Germany's Kriegsmarine and was renamed T108 in 1939. She was scrapped in 1946.

Design and construction
In the first decade of the 20th century, the Imperial German Navy had generally ordered twelve large torpedo boats (Große Torpedoboote) as part of each year's construction programme, with a gradual evolution of design in each year's orders, with speed, range and seaworthiness improving year-on-year. These changes resulted in the ships becoming larger, and concerns grew that the torpedo boats were becoming too big to manoeuvre in and out of the battle fleet. For the 1911 fiscal year's orders, it was decided to revert to a smaller design, with the numbering system for torpedo boats restarting as a consequence. As was normal practice, that year's order was split between two shipyards, with six (V1–V6) to be built by AG Vulcan and six (G7–G12) by Germaniawerft, with detailed design differing between the two shipyards.

Displacement was  design and  full load.

The ship was armed with two 8.8 cm SK L/30 naval guns, one on the forecastle and one aft. Four single 50 cm (19.7 in) torpedo tubes were fitted, with two on the ship's beam in the gap between the forecastle and the ship's bridge which were capable of firing straight ahead, and two on the ship's centreline aft of the funnels. 18 mines could be carried. The ship had a crew of 74 officers and men.

G8 was laid down at Germaniawerft's Kiel shipyard as yard number 171, was launched on 21 December 1911 and completed on 6 August 1912.

Modifications
In 1916, G8 had her guns replaced by 8.8 cm SK L/45 naval guns. In 1921 the 8.8 cm guns were replaced by two 10.5 cm L/45 guns and the ship's forecastle lengthened. From 1928 to 1931, the remaining Germaniawerft-built ships of the class (i.e. , G8,  and ) were rebuilt at Wilhelmshaven. Displacement increased to  design and  full load. On conversion to a training role from 1936, the ship's forward gun was removed and her bridge enlarged. By 1944, armament was a single 10.5 cm gun mounted aft, with two 20 mm anti-aircraft guns.

Service

First World War
On commissioning, G8 joined the 10th Half-flotilla of the 5th Torpedo Boat Flotilla and was still part of that assignment, with the German High Seas Fleet, on the outbreak of war. On 28 August 1914, the British Harwich Force, supported by light cruisers and battlecruisers of the Grand Fleet, carried out a raid towards Heligoland with the intention of destroying patrolling German torpedo boats. The 5th Torpedo boat flotilla, including G8, together with four German light cruisers waited near Heligoland. The 5th Torpedo Boat Flotilla, including G8, were sent out from Heligoland to investigate sightings of British submarines, and ran into several British destroyers. The Flotilla then turned away to try and escape the trap, but the torpedo boat , which along with  could not make full speed and lagged behind the rest of the flotilla, was hit by British shells before the arrival of the German cruiser  allowed the 5th Flotilla to escape. The torpedo boat  of the outer screen did not manage to evade the British force and was sunk. G8 was undamaged.

On 23 January 1915, a German force of Battlecruisers and light cruisers, escorted by torpedo boats, and commanded by Admiral Franz von Hipper, made a sortie to attack British fishing boats on the Dogger Bank. G8, part of the 10th Half-Flotilla, formed part of the escort for Hipper's force. British Naval Intelligence was warned of the raid by radio messages decoded by Room 40, and sent out the Battlecruiser Force from Rosyth, commanded by Admiral Beatty aboard  and the Harwich Force of light cruisers and destroyers, to intercept the German force. The British and German Forces met on the morning of 24 January in the Battle of Dogger Bank. On sighting the British, Hipper ordered his ships to head south-east to escape the British, who set off in pursuit. The armoured cruiser  was disabled by British shells and was sunk, but the rest of the German force escaped, with the German battlecruiser  and the British battlecruiser  badly damaged.

The 10th Half-flotilla sailed in support of the German High Seas Fleet, at the Battle of Jutland on 31 May – 1 June 1916. G8 picked up two survivors of the British battlecruiser  after the British ship exploded. From about 20:15 CET (19:15 GMT), the German torpedo boat flotillas launched a series of torpedo attacks against the British battle line in order to cover the German fleet's turn away from the British. First to attack were the 6th and 9th Flotillas, followed by the 3rd Flotilla. At 20:38, V Flotilla started an attack run, but it was unable to find the British battle line due to poor visibility caused by fog and smoke, and the attack was aborted. During the night action, the 5th Flotilla was ordered to search for and attack the British fleet, but failed to encounter the British battleships. G8 was undamaged.

By late April 1917, the torpedo boats of the 5th Torpedo Boat Flotilla had been fitted for minesweeping and their crews trained in that task, and became increasingly dedicated to minesweeping. G8 remained part of the 10th Half-Flotilla of the 5th Torpedo Boat Flotilla at the end of the War in November 1918.

Postwar operations
G8 survived the war, and was one of the twelve destroyers that the Reichsmarine was allowed to retain under the Treaty of Versailles. In early 1923 G8 was serving in the Baltic Sea. She was modernised in the late 1920s, and was retained in active service after the entry into service of the new Type 23 and Type 24 torpedo boats allowed many of the older boats to be retired or moved to subsidiary duties. In 1932, she was part of the 1st Half-flotilla of the 1st Torpedo Boat Flotilla. G8 remained in the active torpedo boat flotillas in 1935. She became a training ship in 1936, and was employed as a tender in a torpedo school. On 23 April 1939, the ship was renamed T108, to free up the name G8 for a planned class of escort ships.

In late January 1945, the Germans began a mass evacuation of soldiers and civilians from East Prussia and Danzig, which were threatened by the advance of Soviet forces. Following the end of the war, the surviving ships of the Kriegsmarine were divided between the Allies, with T108 being allocated to Great Britain on 6 January 1946 and scrapped.

Notes

References

Bibliography

 

 

Torpedo boats of the Imperial German Navy
World War I torpedo boats of Germany
Ships built in Kiel
1911 ships